Martin Power (20 May 1899 – 7 March 1957) was an Irish hurler who played as a centre-forward for the Kilkenny senior.

Born in Callan, County Kilkenny, Power first arrived on the inter-county scene at the age of twenty-six when he first linked up with the Kilkenny senior team. He made his senior debut during the 1926 championship. Power immediately became a regular member of the starting fifteen, and won two All-Ireland medals, four Leinster medals and one National Hurling League medal.

As a member of the Leinster inter-provincial team on a number of occasions, Power won one Railway Cup medal. At club level he played with Army Metro in Dublin.

Power retired from inter-county hurling following the conclusion of the 1934 championship.

Honours

Army Metro
Dublin Senior Hurling Championship: 1933, 1935

Kilkenny
All-Ireland Senior Hurling Championship: 1932, 1933
Leinster Senior Hurling Championship: 1926, 1929, 1932, 1933
National Hurling League: 1932-33

References

1899 births
1957 deaths
Army Metro hurlers
Kilkenny inter-county hurlers
Kilkenny inter-county Gaelic footballers
All-Ireland Senior Hurling Championship winners